Luís Lázaro Sacramento Ramos (born 1 November 1978) is a Brazilian actor, television presenter, director, writer, and voice actor. He started his acting career with the Flock of Olodum Theater group, in Salvador, and is best known for his portrayal of João Francisco dos Santos in the 2002 film Madame Satã. In 2007, he was nominated for the 35th International Emmy Awards for Best Actor for his role in Cobras & Lagartos.

Filmography

Television

Film

As director

Awards and nominations

See also
 Afro-Brazilians

References

External links

Lazaro's official Blog
Lazaro's Fan Club Blog

Living people
1978 births
Afro-Brazilian people
Brazilian male film actors
Brazilian male telenovela actors
People from Salvador, Bahia
Brazilian male stage actors
Afro-Brazilian male actors